Nicole Ann Lawder (born 31 July 1962) is an Australian politician. She has been a Liberal member of the Australian Capital Territory Legislative Assembly since June 2013 and served as Deputy Leader of the Opposition from October 2016 to October 2020.

Lawder was born in Malaysia to a military family. She received a Bachelor of Arts in Psychology from the Australian National University, having moved to Canberra in 1988. She also received a Masters in Business from Swinburne University of Technology. A member of the National People with Disability and Carer Council (2008–13) and the ACMA Consumer Consultative Forum (2009–13), she was CEO of Homelessness Australia and the Deafness Forum of Australia. In 2012 she was the Liberal Party's Southern Electorate Branch Deputy President, and ran as a candidate at the 2012 ACT election for the seat of Brindabella. Although she was unsuccessful, she was elected on 28 June 2013 in a countback following the resignation of Zed Seselja.

References

1962 births
Living people
Members of the Australian Capital Territory Legislative Assembly
Liberal Party of Australia members of the Australian Capital Territory Legislative Assembly
Women members of the Australian Capital Territory Legislative Assembly
Australian National University alumni
Swinburne University of Technology alumni
21st-century Australian politicians
21st-century Australian women politicians